Alcidion dominicum is a species of longhorn beetles of the subfamily Lamiinae. It was described by Fisher in 1926, and is the holotype is from Dominica (see GBIF link below). A similar species occurs in the Dominican Republic and the species is therefore often wrongly cited to occur in the Dominican Republic too.

References

Beetles described in 1926
Alcidion